Produced by Equal Access Nepal, Naya Nepal is a half-hour-long interactive radio programme going on-air since May 31, 2006. At the beginning, programme issues were concentrated on impact of decade long armed conflict and discussed on root cause of conflict with special reference to change political context of Nepal. Naya Nepal radio programme goes on-air once a week through Radio Nepal, Word Space satellite channel and more than 45 FM stations across the country.  Main themes of the programme are peace building (conflict transformation), good governance, human rights, rule of law, political reform process, Constituent Assembly (CA) election, constitution building process etc. The main target groups are youth and adult population of rural areas.

History 
In October 2005, Equal Access began implementation of “Sundar Shanta Bishal” (SSB), Beautiful  Peaceful Diverse Land, with the predominant aim of utilizing radio and outreach to raise  awareness across Nepal of the rising human cost of the conflict, through a combination of real  ‘voices from the field’ and dramatized accounts of Nepali and international nonviolent  movements conveyed via a dynamic serial drama. Initial program design and implementation  took place against a backdrop of strict media censorship. Following the crackdown on the  media in the wake of the King's takeover in  February 2005, and with news prohibited from  broadcast, Beautiful Peaceful Diverse Land (Sundar  Shanta Bishal - SSB) was designed to empower  rural Nepalis affected by the conflict with a range of nonviolent tools to make their voices heard.

The transformative events in Nepal throughout 2006 and later years and the changed on ground realities of  the conflict have allowed the program to address many questions for rural and urban Nepalis- that were precisely restricted, such as discussions of democracy and corruption. As Nepal  moves forward in this peace process, SSB has shifted too to better react to the changing on the  ground situation, a daily reality where there is hope for a brighter future. To convey this hope for a brighter future by  changing SSB's name to “Naya Nepal”, New Nepal, showing the heartfelt optimism of a people  truly wanting peace.

2 episodes of Naya Nepal used to be produced and broadcast once a week. Since February 2007 Naya Nepal focused on Women and their issues to be raised in Constituent Assembly once in a week and peace-building and governance in next episode at same week It disseminated critically needed information and education material in relation to how youth and adult population in Nepall can contribute in peace and reconciliation in transition period. But since March 2009, only one episode of Naya Nepal is produced and broadcast once a week.

Naya Nepal Radio Program and Community Activities 

Naya Nepal has supported community reporters and local FM stations in enhancing their capabilities. Naya Nepal trained a total of 10 community reporters and 12 producers of local FM stations to produce local version of Naya Nepal as well as to send community voices to the central production unit at Equal Access. Local versions of Naya Nepal were produced by 7 FM stations in Nepali language.  Three FM stations produced Naya Nepal in Maithali language, one FM station in Bhojpuri languages, 1 FM station in Doteli and Tharu languages and 1 FM station is in Tamang language.

Naya Nepal has worked with many community organizations like SOLVE Nepal, General Welfare Pratisthan (GWP) and Samjhauta Nepal to mobilize community reporters and to facilitate listener's club and get feedback from the listener's club. Feedbacks sent by the Listener's Club are incorporated in the radio programmes.

Present 

At present, Naya Nepal is covering issues which are directly related with minorities of Nepal includes Dalit, Women, and other disadvantaged group with special reference to their issues to be incorporated in new constitution.  Naya Nepal radio programme facilitated direct interaction between community and CA members in direct phone-in programme.

In order to produce and disseminate Naya Nepal various donor agencies such as USAID, UNDEF, UNIFEM, Institute of Peace & Justice (IPJ), International Alert (IA), International Center for Transitional Justice (ICTJ), and CEDPA has provided financial and technical support.

The program is being produced in the theme of Judicial and Security Sector Reform (JSSR) in collaboration with IA in 2009.

References

External links
 Equal Access
 Nepal Radio Homepage

Nepalese radio programs
2006 radio programme debuts
Talk radio programs